Georges Feydeau, the best-known writer of French farce in the late 19th and early 20th centuries, wrote more than twenty full-length comic plays and twenty one-act ones. Some of these have been adapted for the cinema. Although Feydeau was active well into the era of film he never wrote for the medium, but within two years of his death in 1921 other writers and directors began to take his plays as the basis for films, of which more than twenty have been made, in several countries and languages.

Films based on Feydeau plays

Television adaptations

In the 1960s and 1970s the BBC filmed a series of fourteen farces by Feydeau, adapted by Caryl Brahms and Ned Sherrin, under the collective title Ooh La La. Some were adapted from one-act plays, others from full-length ones. All fourteen starred Patrick Cargill.

References

 
Films based on plays
19th-century French dramatists and playwrights
20th-century French dramatists and playwrights
19th-century French male writers
20th-century French male writers